More than 1,030 people were killed in the 2002 heatwave in South India. Most of the dead were poor and elderly and a majority of deaths occurred in the southern state of Andhra Pradesh. In the districts that were impacted most, the heat was so severe that ponds and rivers evaporated and in those same districts birds had fallen from the sky and animals were collapsing from the intense heat. 
 
It is said by officials to be the worst heat wave in four years. The relief commissioner of Andhra Pradesh, Rosaiah, said that the maximum number of 172 deaths related to heat took place in the East Godavari district. There were also 166 deaths in Prakasam and 144 deaths in West Godavari.

Unusually high temperatures were detected across India during April of the year 2002. In addition, this heat wave over northern zones of India lasted from the middle of April to the third week in May, thus, causing these fatalities. On May 10 the highest temperature recorded in the region of Gannavaram (Vijayawada) was 49 oC (120 oF). According to the BBC News, "Heatwaves are defined as periods of abnormally high temperatures and usually occur between March and June in India. May is the country's hottest month, with an average maximum temperature of 41 oC (104 oF) in Delhi. Longer, more severe heatwaves are becoming increasingly frequent globally. Intense heat can cause cramps, exhaustion and heat stroke. Thousands of people have died across India during heatwaves in 2002 and 2003." The heatwaves also affected the northern states of Punjab, and Haryana. In Orissa, 100 people suffered from heat-related sickness.

Background and details of the 2002 Indian heat wave

Definition of Heat Wave 
Heatwave as a hazard causing disaster scenario is little more than the physical phenomenon of high heat conditions and is characterized as a complex of hydro-climatic risks coupled with social, occupational, and public health risks. A Heat Wave is a period of abnormally high temperatures, more than the normal maximum temperature that occurs during the summer season in the North-Western parts of India.

2002 Indian Heat Wave 
One of the worst heat waves so far swept through India in May 2002. This was caused by an extreme drought triggered by the El Niño effect. The fierce heatwave killed more than 1,000 people in the country. Elderly people account for most of the deaths, unable to bear temperatures that hit 50 oC  (122 oF) in parts of the southern Andhra Pradesh state during the week of May 9–15. In some areas, temperatures were so extreme that many tin-roofed homes turned into ovens, water catchments dried up and animals collapsed from the heat. Heatwave in 2002 led not only to a very high mortality rate, but also to the high morbidity of many heat-related diseases and caused a fatal blow to the local agriculture and economy.

Heatwave events in India during the past 20 years 
Heat health impacts in India are serious. Estimates suggest that there have been over 22,000 heat-related fatalities in India since 1992. Due to the El Niño effect, 2015 is considered the hottest year ever, the country witnessed the fifth deadliest heatwave in history. The other nine warmest years on record are 2009, 2010, 2003, 2002, 2014, 1998, 2006 and 2007. In addition to the vulnerable populations identified above, the poor may be differentially impacted on account of gaps in health services, housing, and basic amenities.

Heatwave developing trend 
India Meteorological Department report says that heat waves (40oC+ temperatures) are recurring more frequently and with greater intensity every year in India due to climate change and global warming. Therefore, harder works should not only be taken on alleviating the negative impact of the heatwave, but also the root cause problem of climate warming.

Impact of heatwave as a disaster

Consequences of Indian heatwave so far

Physical impacts 
The 2002 Indian heat waves was a record-breaking event, which can be considered as a wake-up call and a shock to the Indian order and development. 330 million people were impacted by this heatwave that took about 1030 lives in parts of the southern Andhra Pradesh state during the second week of May 2002, which elderly and poor people account for most of the deaths due to dehydration and heatstroke. People were unable to bear temperatures that hit 50 oC (122 oFahrenheit) as well as the unusual high night-time temperatures.

Geographical impacts 
The heatwave forced the early-season rice (Basmati) in the milk-ripe stage to ripening, reducing the thousand-grain mass as well as the yield due to transpiration. High-temperature damage caused detrimental impacts to the growth of crops as water supply and demand were out of balance, resulting in wilting and bud drop. In addition, such extreme events also greatly increased the water and electricity consumption of urban residents in India.

Causes of Increasing Heat Wave Incidents

Geographical 
Heatwave occur mostly over an interior plain area when dry and warmer air is transported in a region with clear skies, and generally develop over Northwest India and spread gradually eastwards & southwards. The direct cause of the heatwave was the anticyclones or high-pressure ridges occurred in the atmosphere, which leads to a dry climate and a risen temperature without evaporating moisture.

Climate factors 
According to case studies carried out by German climatologist Stefan Rahmstorf, there is a causal relationship between heatwave and global warming. Nonetheless, following the effects posed by the heatwave, the WHO, alongside other healthcare organizations, are coming up with strategies to bring back the world into operations.

Response & Adjustments

Local response 
P Tulsi Rani, special commissioner for disaster management in the state said: "The state government has taken up education programs through television and other media to tell people not to venture into the outside without a cap." In addition, the Andhra Pradesh government has advised people to stay indoors and drink plenty of water until cooler weather arrives. The local authorities arranged for drinking water supply points, oral rehydration salts and intravenous fluids in public places such as railway and bus stations, and many emergency medical camps have been set up.

International response 
Neighboring Pakistan and Afghanistan are hot as well, but India to be suffering far worse. Therefore, following the example of India's measures in this regard, they were able to face the threat of a heatwave.

Health Impacts of Heat Waves

Heatwave-induced diseases and mortality 
Diseases that can be identified as a direct result of prolonged exposure to high ambient temperatures are heat exhaustion, heat syncope, and heatstroke. During heat waves, there is a significant increase in total daily mortality in all cities. Natural, respiratory, cardiovascular, and cerebrovascular mortality rates increased significantly under the influence of the heatwave. The health status of people with chronic respiratory diseases deteriorates rapidly during periods of high temperatures.

Urban-rural differences in health risks 
Human mortality is influenced by ambient meteorological conditions and levels of atmospheric pollutants. Stagnant atmospheric conditions, common during heatwaves, can trap pollutants in urban areas, exacerbating the negative effects of heatwaves. As heat waves intensify and prolong under climate change, the health risks for urban residents will be significantly higher than for rural residents. Heatwaves not only raise ambient temperatures, but also exacerbate temperature differences between urban and rural areas.

Seasonal differences in health risks 
More frequent heatwaves in late spring and early summer may affect short-term human adaptation. Heatwaves in early summer now have a greater impact on heat-related morbidity and mortality than later in the same season. This is attributed to the effects of short-term adaptation to thermal conditions through physiological and behavioral adaptations.

Age differences in health risks 
Older people are more likely to suffer from heatstroke than younger people due to dysfunctional thermoregulatory mechanisms, chronic dehydration, medication, and diseases involving the thermoregulatory system. If left untreated, heatstroke can fail to reduce body temperature rapidly, which is fatal, and survivors may suffer long-term disability.

Shorter- and longer-term impacts and other consequences

Shorter-term impacts and consequences

Economy 
Extreme high temperatures hit Indian tourism by reducing the number of tourists, and then affected the social economy of this period. Similarly, the chaotic social conditions and low agricultural production will inevitably cause specific economic losses.

Agricultural 
As a populous country, Indian dwellers depend on basic agriculture for food and livelihood. Kharif crops, one of the main foods in India, are sown in May to June, any extreme temperature is bound to affect productivity. Therefore, in May 2002, rice, one of the Indian staple foods, declines due to lower production of related grain yield. Consequently, it caused more hunger and death problems.

livelihood 
High temperatures prevented outdoor workers from working outdoors, such as traffic police and cleaners. Especially, for a state (India) where the majority of individuals might be working in unorganized and informal sectors, this condition compromised the income source of the vulnerable population.

Longer-term impacts and consequences

Economy 
Potential climate impacts like sea-level rise, changes in the monsoon, and drought may lead to food production cuts, private and public property loss, and infrastructure damage. All of these impacts set back general socio-economic development.

Geo-anthropology 
Studies have proved that the earth's latitude has a great impact on human destiny. In some way, low-dimensional tropical countries are relatively poorer and more vulnerable to diseases due to the higher temperature. Meanwhile, as the harm of the heatwave increases, so will the vulnerability of India's future population, especially in Indo-Gangetic plains.

Climate 
In the aspect of vulnerability to climate change, India is one of the most significant countries in the world. The frequency and intensity of heatwave events in India are projected to increase in the future. Most models indicate that the Indian summer monsoons will change disorderly with a warming climate. This means that the time of the monsoon that relieves the heat is more uncertain and that the consequences of the heat waves may be more unpredictable.

Lessons learned from the disaster

Improving adaptability to thermal environments 
In terms of architecture, it is possible to construct high ceilings and spacious but lowered verandas to provide more shade. With respect to clothing, wear more light and loose clothing made of cotton and use a hat to protect yourself from direct sunlight. And about lifestyle, try to choose to exercise and work hard in the early morning or late afternoon, and during the summer months a hearty breakfast and a light lunch should be part of our lives.

Concretization and diversification of measures 
To protect public health, heat-related policies are increasingly being adopted by Indian authorities, such as Ahmedabad Heat Action Plan, launched in 2013, which is an acclaimed and successful policy response in India and beyond.
It's effective to hold fun challenges, such as a global competition was launched in 2021 - The Million Cool Roofs Challenge, where the top of a building is coated with solar reflective paint and covered with white tiles or films to help combat climate change. The team that demonstrates the best sustainable and transferable model can be awarded US$1 million.

References

Heat waves in India
Indian Heatwave, 2002
History of Andhra Pradesh (1947–2014)
Disasters in Andhra Pradesh
Indian Heatwave, 2002